The 1982 Iowa State Cyclones football team represented Iowa State University during the 1982 NCAA Division I-A football season.  They played their home games at Cyclone Stadium in Ames, Iowa. They participated as members of the Big Eight Conference.  The team was coached by head coach Donnie Duncan.

Schedule

Roster

Game summaries

Tennessee

Iowa State

Team players in the 1983 NFL Draft

References

Iowa State
Iowa State Cyclones football seasons
Iowa State Cyclones football